Toukoroba is a rural commune and village in the Cercle of Banamba in the Koulikoro Region of south-western Mali. The commune contains 17 villages.

References

External links
.

Communes of Koulikoro Region